The Yarrbilgong Falls, a waterfall on the Coomera River, is located within Lamington National Park in the South East region of Queensland, Australia. 

Access to the falls is along the main Coomera Track that links Binna Burra and O'Reilly's Guesthouse. The falls descend  into Coomera Gorge.

See also

 List of waterfalls of Queensland

References

Waterfalls of Queensland
South East Queensland